A rock cake, also called a rock bun, is a small cake with a rough surface resembling a rock.
They were promoted by the British Ministry of Food during the Second World War since they require fewer eggs and less sugar than ordinary cakes, an important savings in a time of strict rationing. Traditional recipes bulked them with oatmeal, which was more readily available than white flour.

Recipe
Mrs Beeton's widely known 1861 recipe book includes two early recipes for rock cakes. One calls for flour, butter, 'moist sugar', lemon, milk, and baking powder. The other recipe more closely resembles shortbread, as it uses flour, butter, and currants but no leavening agent.

A typical modern recipe for 12 cakes requires about 200 g of flour, 100 g of butter or margarine, 50 g of sugar, 1 beaten egg, 1 teaspoon of baking powder, 2 tablespoons of milk, 150 g of dried fruit such as currants, raisins, candied orange peel, etc., and a pinch of nutmeg and mixed spices. Usually, flour and butter are first mixed until the mixture resembles breadcrumbs; then the other ingredients are added to create a stiff dough, which is dropped from a spoon to a baking tray or roughly formed with two forks. The cakes (optionally sprinkled with sugar and cinnamon) are baked for about 15 minutes at 200-220°C, retaining an uneven form and contour.

Variations include the Jamaican rock cake, which is similar, but usually includes grated coconut, and the traditional British rock cake, which contains oatmeal.

In popular culture

Author Agatha Christie mentions rock cakes in her stories and novels, including Three Blind Mice and The Murder at the Vicarage. Detective Alan Grant is offered rock buns in Josephine Tey's novel The Daughter of Time.

They are also a common feature in the popular Harry Potter series of books and films. For example, Hagrid serves rock cakes to Harry Potter and Ron Weasley at tea in Harry Potter and the Philosopher's Stone. Unfortunately, his rock cakes are hard enough to crack their teeth and they politely decline them (and other examples of his cooking) in later stories.

Early in The African Queen, Mr. Allnut (Humphrey Bogart) is offered a rock cake while at tea. Rock cakes are also referred to in an early scene in the 1939 movie, Goodbye Mr. Chips. They are mentioned as an alternative to doughnuts in the 1940 British film Night Train to Munich.

In the Benny Hill song "Ernie (The Fastest Milkman in the West)", Ernie is killed by a rock cake below the heart and a pork pie to the face.

In the British soap opera EastEnders, rock cakes are stocked in the local cafe. Tamwar Masood frequently eats them as an alternative to pastries.

In the British series 'Allo 'Allo, season 7, episode 10, rock cakes are used to feed the British Airmen that are trapped in the sewers under the village. René Artois (Gorden Kaye) and his wife also give rock cakes to the gypsies to get information from them.

In the P. G. Wodehouse novel Sam the Sudden, (1925), Willoughby Braddock warns Kay Derrick against eating rock cakes baked by Clara Lippet, the cook, as they are her worst effort. In Wodehouse's novel Money in the Bank, (1942), character J G Miller tosses unwanted rock cakes into the office across the way; when he goes to that office to apologize, he encounters Anne Benedick and her uncle Lord Uffenham, beginning the plot.

See also
Scone
Fat rascal

References

External links
 Cooking for Girls; a rock cake recipe written for children.

British cakes
British cuisine
Cookies
Jamaican cuisine
Barbadian cuisine
Economic history of World War II